Atlas is a three-issue comic book series by cartoonist Dylan Horrocks.
Published by Drawn & Quarterly, the series ran from 2001 to 2006. The series features characters first introduced in Horrocks' previous series, Pickle.

There was a four-year hiatus between issues #1 and #2, caused by Horrocks' work as the writer of DC Comics' Batgirl comic.

References

External links
 Dylan Horrocks' website
 Atlas at the Grand Comics Database

Drawn & Quarterly titles
2001 comics debuts
Comics by Dylan Horrocks